Molina is a Chilean city and commune in Curicó Province, Maule Region. Molina is named after Chilean Jesuit Juan Ignacio Molina.

Demographics
Of these, 28,232 (73.3%) lived in urban areas and 10,289 (26.7%) in rural areas. The population grew by 8% (2,847 persons) between the 1992 and 2002 censuses.

Administration
As a commune, Molina is a third-level administrative division of Chile administered by a municipal council, headed by an alcalde who is directly elected every four years. The 2008-2012 alcalde is Mirtha Segura Ovalle (UDI).

Within the electoral divisions of Chile, Molina is represented in the Chamber of Deputies by Roberto León (PDC) and Celso Morales (UDI) as part of the 36th electoral district, together with Curicó, Teno, Romeral, Sagrada Familia, Hualañé, Licantén, Vichuquén and Rauco. The commune is represented in the Senate by Juan Antonio Coloma Correa (UDI) and Andrés Zaldívar Larraín (PDC) as part of the 10th senatorial constituency (Maule-North).

Notable people
 

Laureano Ladrón de Guevara (1889–1968), painter, printmaker and muralist

References

External links
  Municipality of Molina

Communes of Chile
Populated places in Curicó Province